This is a list of Spanish television related events in 1974.

Events 
 11 January: Juan José Rosón is appointed Director General of RTVE.
 24 April: The reporter Manolo Alcalá covers from Lisbon for TVE the Carnation Revolution.
 12 June: The Commission for Enquiry and Vigilance on Advertising in TVE is created.
 22 November: Jesús Sancho Rof is appointed Director General of RTVE.

Debuts

Television shows

La 1

Ending this year

La 1

Foreign series debuts in Spain

La 1

Births

Deaths 
 23 January - Artur Kaps, director, 61.
 11 February - Antonio Casal, actor, 63.
 16 September - Luis Morris, actor, 44.
 20 November - Manuel Dicenta, actor, 69.

See also
1974 in Spain
List of Spanish films of 1974

References 

1974 in Spanish television